The Malaysian Expressway System is a network of national controlled-access expressways in Malaysia that forms the primary backbone network of Malaysian national highways. The network begins with the Tanjung Malim–Slim River tolled road (Federal Route 1) which was opened to traffic on 16 March 1966, later North–South Expressway (NSE), and is being substantially developed. Malaysian expressways are built by private companies under the supervision of the government highway authority, Malaysian Highway Authority (abbreviated as MHA; also referred to as Lembaga Lebuhraya Malaysia (LLM) in Malay).

Overview
The expressway network of Malaysia is considered as one of the best controlled-access expressway network in Asia after Japan and South Korea. The closed toll expressway system is similar to the Japanese Expressway System and Chinese Expressway System. All Malaysian toll expressways are controlled-access highway and managed in the Build-Operate-Transfer (BOT) system.

There are expressways in West Malaysia and East Malaysia, however, the former are better-connected. The North–South Expressway passes through all the major cities and conurbations in West Malaysia, such as Penang, Ipoh, the Klang Valley and Johor Bahru. The Pan Borneo Highway connects the Malaysian states of Sabah and Sarawak with Brunei.

Asian Highway Network

A few major expressways in Malaysia are part of the larger Asian Highway Network. The Asian Highway Network is an international project between Asian nations to develop their highway systems, which will form main routes in the network. Seven Asian Highway routes pass through Malaysia:-

 AH2 Asian Highway Route 2 – along the North–South Expressway E1 and E2
 AH18 Asian Highway Route 18 – along the Federal Route 3
 AH140 Asian Highway Route 140 – along the Federal Route 4  and Butterworth–Kulim Expressway E15
 AH141 Asian Highway Route 141 – consists of New Klang Valley Expressway E1 (Bukit Lanjan–Jalan Duta), Duta–Ulu Klang Expressway E33 (Jalan Duta–Sentul Pasar and Sentul Pasar–Greenwood), Kuala Lumpur Middle Ring Road 2 28 (Greenwood–Gombak North Interchange), Kuala Lumpur–Karak Expressway E8, East Coast Expressway E8 and Gebeng Bypass 101
 AH142 Asian Highway Route 142 – along the MEC Highway FT222, Tun Razak Highway FT12 and Federal Route 1 (Segamat–Yong Peng South Interchange)
 AH143 Asian Highway Route 143 – along the Second Link Expressway E3 
 AH150 Asian Highway Route 150 – along the Pan Borneo Highway.

AH2 border crossing dispute
The status of the route alignment of the Asian Highway 2 crossing the Malaysia–Singapore border is in dispute. Malaysia had commissioned the Second Link Expressway E3 as part of AH2 to maintain the primary access-controlled highway status of the route. Meanwhile, Singapore had commissioned the Johor–Singapore Causeway and the Bukit Timah Expressway as part of AH2, as the Johor–Singapore Causeway is the main gateway to Singapore from Malaysia, which could mean that the Skudai Highway would be included in the route alignment instead of the Second Link Expressway.

The completion of Johor Bahru Eastern Dispersal Link Expressway (EDL) in 2012, the Asian Highway AH2 route were re-routed to Eastern Dispersal Link Expressway (EDL) from Second Link Expressway. Second Link Expressway were gazetted as a part of Asian Highway AH143.

The Second Link Expressway, the Ayer Rajah Expressway, Marina Coastal Expressway and Kallang–Paya Lebar Expressway were later gazetted as Asian Highway AH143.

History

Interstate

Before tolled expressways were introduced in the mid-1970s, most Malaysians travelled around Peninsula Malaysia on federal roads.

The major reasons for building new expressways in Malaysia are the increasing number of vehicles along federal routes, the opening of major ports and airports in Malaysia, and the increasing population in major cities and towns of Malaysia.

In 1966, the Highway Planning Unit was established under the Ministry of Works and Communications.

The first tolled highway in Malaysia was the  Tanjung Malim–Slim River tolled road (Federal Route 1) which was opened to traffic on 16 March 1966. It saved journey time by half an hour, and cars were charged 50 sen, buses and lorries RM1 and motorcycles 20 sen. However, in 1994, with the completion of the North–South Expressway, the toll plaza was removed and it became a toll-free highway.

In 1970, the first comprehensive five-year road development programme was formulated by the Highway Planning Unit, which included expanding rural roads and plans to construct three new highways linking the east and west coasts.

On 27 March 1974, the Kuala Lumpur–Seremban Expressway was constructed. Funded by a loan by the World Bank, the  expressway was constructed in three phases; the first phase was from Kuala Lumpur to Nilai, while the second phase was from Nilai to Seremban. The third phase was the rehabilitation of the old Federal Route 1 from Kuala Lumpur to Seremban as a toll-free alternative to motorists. The completion of the Kuala Lumpur–Seremban Expressway in June 1977 marking the first step towards the construction of the new interstate expressway known as North–South Expressway (NSE).

The Kuala Lumpur–Karak Highway (Federal Route 2) was built between 1976 and 1979. Meanwhile, the  Genting Sempah Tunnel was the first highway tunnel in Malaysia, constructed between 1977 and 1979. The tunnel was opened in 1979 by the then Minister of Works and Communications, Dato' Abdul Ghani Gilong.

The first sections of the North–South Expressway were the toll sections of the Kuala Lumpur–Seremban Expressway from Sungai Besi to Labu toll plazas, which was opened on 16 June 1982. The next sections were Bukit Kayu Hitam–Jitra and Senai–Johor Bahru stretches opened in 1985. Then the Ipoh–Changkat Jering and Seremban–Ayer Keroh stretches, which were opened to traffic in 1986. However, on 1 October 1987 the closed-toll system came into force along the Kuala Lumpur–Ayer Keroh and Ipoh–Changkat Jering stretches. The Ayer Keroh–Pagoh stretch on the North–South Expressway was opened to traffic in 1988. All sections of the North–South Expressway were completed and officially opened on 8 September 1994 by the former Prime Minister of Malaysia, Tun Dr Mahathir Mohamad.

Other interstate expressway projects in Malaysia are North–South Expressway Central Link  (opened 1996), East Coast Expressway (opened 2004) and Kajang–Seremban Highway (opened 2008).

Because of a (permanent) massive traffic jam on the North–South Expressway Southern Route between Seremban and Nilai in Negeri Sembilan, a new bypass expressway named Paroi–Senawang–KLIA Expressway was proposed in 2013 to help reduce the traffic jams at the area.

The Phase 2 of the East Coast Expressway (Terengganu) linking Jabur and Kuala Terengganu was completed on 31 January 2015, thus completing the alignment of the East Coast Expressway from Kuala Lumpur to Kuala Terengganu.

The new project in the west coast of Peninsula Malaysia, West Coast Expressway (WCE) has been unveiled by the government. Construction of the  expressway linking Banting, Selangor and Taiping, Perak was to start in 2015.

Greater Kuala Lumpur and Klang Valley

The history of the highways in the Klang Valley started after the expulsion of Singapore from Malaysia on 9 August 1965, when the Malaysian government decided to make Port Swettenham (now Port Klang) Malaysia's new national port as a replacement for Singapore. As a result, the government planned to build a first highway in Klang Valley known as Federal Highway connecting Port Swettenham (now Port Klang) to Kuala Lumpur in the 1960s.

In 1967, the  Federal Highway (Federal Route 2), the first dual-carriageway highway in Malaysia was opened to traffic.

In the early 1990s the federal government decided to build more expressways and highways in Klang Valley because of the increasing size and population of the Klang Valley conurbation, development of new townships and industrial estates, and the massive traffic jams along Federal Highway.

The New Klang Valley Expressway (NKVE), which was opened in 1990, is the second link to Kuala Lumpur from Klang after Federal Highway. In 1997, North–South Expressway Central Link (NSECL), which is the main link to Kuala Lumpur International Airport (KLIA) was opened to traffic.

Other expressway projects in Klang Valley are Shah Alam Expressway (SAE/KESAS) (opened 1997), Damansara–Puchong Expressway (LDP) (opened 1999), Sprint Expressway (opened 2001), New Pantai Expressway (NPE) (opened 2004), SMART Tunnel (opened 2007), KL–KLIA Dedicated Expressway or Kuala Lumpur–Putrajaya Expressway (KLPE) (now Maju Expressway (MEX)) (opened 2007) and Duta–Ulu Klang Expressway (DUKE) (opened 2009).

In addition to Kuala Lumpur Inner Ring Road (KLIRR) as the inner ring road in Kuala Lumpur, Kuala Lumpur Middle Ring Road 1 (KLMRR1), Kuala Lumpur Western/Northern Dispersal Link Scheme (Sprint Expressway and DUKE) and Kuala Lumpur Middle Ring Road 2 (KLMRR2) also act as middle ring roads of the city. Kuala Lumpur–Kuala Selangor Expressway (KLS) (formerly Assam Jawa–Templer Park Highway (LATAR)), Kajang Dispersal Link Expressway (SILK), South Klang Valley Expressway (SKVE) and the planning Kuala Lumpur Outer Ring Road (KLORR) may form the outer ring roads of Kuala Lumpur.

Following the formation of the Greater Kuala Lumpur in the early 2010s, many expressways and highways will be built in the Greater Kuala Lumpur under the Economic Transformation Programme (ETP). These are the Besraya Extension Expressway (now part of the Besraya Expressway) (opened 2012), Damansara–Shah Alam Elevated Expressway (DASH), Sungai Besi–Ulu Klang Elevated Expressway (SUKE), East Klang Valley Expressway (EKVE) which will be part of the KLORR system, Sri Damansara Link and Tun Razak Link of the DUKE, Kinrara–Damansara Expressway (KIDEX Skyway) and Serdang–Kinrara–Putrajaya Expressway (SKIP). However, the proposed Kinrara–Damansara Expressway (KIDEX Skyway) project was officially scrapped by the Selangor State Government due to the several protests by the local Petaling Jaya citizens but it was rebranded as Petaling Jaya Dispersal Link Expressway and also the Bangi-Putrajaya Expressway.

Penang and Greater Penang

The history of highways in Penang began in the 1970s when the Malaysian federal government decided to build the Penang Bridge, connecting Seberang Perai and Penang Island. The construction of the Penang Bridge, between Perai on the mainland and Gelugor on Penang Island, began in 1982 and was completed in 1985. This bridge was officially opened on 14 September 1985 by then Malaysian Prime Minister, Mahathir Mohamad.

The main reasons for constructing new expressways in Penang are the increasing populations in George Town and Butterworth, and the need for more cross-strait linkages. Prior to the construction of the Penang Bridge, the only way to cross the Penang Strait between Penang Island and the mainland was via ferries. In addition, major industrial estates, such as in Bayan Lepas on the island and Perai on the mainland, were opened, leading to the growth of residential townships like Bayan Baru and Seberang Jaya. These necessitated the construction of more bridges and expressways in the state.

Since then, a number of other expressway projects within Penang, such as the Butterworth Outer Ring Road (BORR), the Butterworth–Seberang Jaya Toll Road and the Tun Dr Lim Chong Eu Expressway were completed. On densely populated Penang Island, the Gelugor Highway and the Penang Middle Ring Road were also created to alleviate traffic congestion.

The.Butterworth–Kulim Expressway (BKE) is a tolled expressway that connects Butterworth with the town of Kulim (and Kulim Hi-tech Park) in neighbouring Kedah. This interstate highway was built as industrialisation began to spread out from Seberang Perai towards southern Kedah in the 1980s, forming what is now Greater Penang.

The Second Penang Bridge, officially named the Sultan Abdul Halim Muadzam Shah Bridge, was opened on 1 March 2014 by the Malaysian Prime Minister, Najib Tun Razak. This  bridge, linking Batu Maung on Penang Island and Batu Kawan in Seberang Perai, is currently the longest bridge in Southeast Asia.

Iskandar Malaysia and Johor Bahru

The history of highways in Johor Bahru started in the 1980s when the city of Johor Bahru became a main southern international gateway to Malaysia from Singapore after the separation of Singapore from Malaysia on 9 August 1965.

The main reasons for building expressways in Johor Bahru are the increasing size of the Johor Bahru metropolitan area since it achieved city status on 1 January 1994, and the formation of the South Johor Economic Region (SJER) or Iskandar Development Region (IDR) (now Iskandar Malaysia) on 30 July 2006. Many townships have been constructed around Johor Bahru and industrial estates have been developed in areas such as Senai, Skudai, Tebrau, Pasir Gudang and Tampoi.

The first highway in Johor Bahru was Skudai Highway linking Senai to Johor Causeway, which was completed in 1985 and it was the first toll highway in Johor Bahru. However the toll plaza near Senai was abolished in 2004. Kempas Highway, the only state road in Malaysia constructed as a 2-lane highway was completed in 1994. The Malaysia–Singapore Second Crossing, which is the second link to Singapore after Johor Causeway, was opened to traffic on 18 April 1998.

Other expressway projects in Johor Bahru are Senai–Desaru Expressway (SDE) linking Senai in the west to Desaru in east coast of Johor, the Johor Bahru Eastern Dispersal Link Expressway (EDL) which linking Pandan interchange of the North–South Expressway to the new Sultan Iskandar CIQ Building in city centre, the Iskandar Coastal Highway linking Nusajaya in the west to the city centre in the east and the Johor Bahru East Coast Highway linking Kampung Bakar Batu passing through Permas Jaya, Taman Rinting and finally towards Pasir Gudang.

In addition to Johor Bahru Inner Ring Road (JBIRR) as the inner ring road in Johor Bahru, Pasir Gudang Highway, Second Link Expressway and Johor Bahru Parkway also act as middle ring roads of the city. Second Link Expressway and the Senai–Desaru Expressway may form the outer ring roads of Johor Bahru.

East Malaysia

The history of highways in East Malaysia started in the 1960s when the federal government decided to build the Pan Borneo Highway, linking Sarawak and Sabah state.

The Pan Borneo Highway project is a joint project between the governments of Brunei and Malaysia. The project started as soon as Sarawak and Sabah joined the federation of Malaysia in 1963. The lack of a road network system in Sarawak was the main factor of the construction.

There are one toll expressway, one toll federal highway and one toll state highway in Sarawak – the Tun Salahuddin Bridge in Kuching city, the Miri–Baram Highway in Miri Division, and the Lanang Bridge in Sibu. The Tun Salahuddin Bridge is the first only toll expressway in East Malaysia. However, the toll collection of both Lanang Bridge and Tun Salahuddin Bridge were abolished in 2015 and 2016 by the Sarawak state government.

On 31 March 2015, the dual carriageway toll free Pan Borneo Expressway in Sarawak was unveiled by the Federal Government. The highway project will be implemented with Lebuhraya Borneo Utara Sdn Bhd (LBU) as the Project Delivery Partner (PDP) managing and supervising its construction.

Features

Expressway standards

The construction, standards, management and usage of expressways in Malaysia are subject to Federal Roads Act (Private Management) 1984. In Malaysia, expressways are defined as high-speed routes with at least four lanes (two in each direction) and should have full access control or partial access control. Most expressways in Malaysia are controlled-access expressways.

However, the section between Cahaya Baru and Penawar of the Senai–Desaru Expressway E22 is built as a two-lane single carriageway with the similar features as the Swiss autostrasse, making it as the first true two-lane controlled-access expressway in Malaysia followed by the section of Teluk Panglima Garang and Pulau Indah of the South Klang Valley Expressway (SKVE) E26 All expressways are considered federal highways, but administered by Malaysian Highway Authority (MHA) and the respective concessionaire companies.

The highways are built with partial access control, and grade-separated interchanges and at-grade crossings are both permitted. However, it is possible for a federal or state highway to be built with almost equivalent standard of an expressway with the exception of lower speed limit, for example the Federal Highway. Highways can be built either as dual-carriageway or two-lane single carriageway.

Before the mid-1990s, there were no specific coding system for the expressways. When more and more expressways were built, a system of expressway numbering was applied to all expressways. Expressways are labelled with the letter "E" followed by assigned numbers, for example the code for North–South Expressway southern route is E2. The expressways have green signs and the text colour is white.

However, there are some exceptions in some highways. Some highways like Federal Highway (Federal Route 2) and Skudai Highway (Federal Route 1) retain their federal route codes. In addition, there are some highways in Malaysia which are classified as municipal roads such as Kuala Lumpur Middle Ring Road 1.

The highway exit numbers use the format "xxnn", where "xx" is the expressway code number (which can be one or two digits) and "nn" is the two-digit assigned number for each highway exit. For example, Johor Bahru exit at the end of North–South Expressway is labelled exit 257, where the last two digits (57) are the assigned exit number and the first digit (2) is the expressway route number (E2). Meanwhile, Jalan Templer exit at the Federal Highway is labelled exit 224, where the two digits (24) are the assigned exit number and the first digit (2) is the federal route number (2). Expressways have distance markers in green colour (blue for federal expressways and highways) placed every .

Route number categories

Expressway route numbers

Federal route numbers

Pavements
Most expressways are paved with typical tarmac, which is a mixture of fine stone chips and tar; however, some expressways are paved with concrete such as North–South Expressway Northern Route (from Bukit Lanjan Interchange, Selangor to Tapah interchange, Perak), New Klang Valley Expressway, North–South Expressway Southern Route (from Ayer Keroh interchange, Melaka to Tangkak interchange, Johor), SMART Tunnel and Skudai–Pontian Highway (from Universiti Teknologi Malaysia interchange to Taman Sri Pulai junction). Meanwhile, at Federal Highway linking Klang to Kuala Lumpur, the section of the expressway from Subang Jaya to Kota Darul Ehsan near Petaling Jaya is paved with asphalt.

Expressway monitoring and maintenance

Monitoring
Since 1986, Malaysian expressways have been built by private companies under the supervision of the government highway authority, Lembaga Lebuhraya Malaysia (Malaysian Highway Authority). Every private concession company, such as PLUS Expressways, ANIH Berhad (formerly MTD Prime) and the others have monitored and maintained their expressways.

Maintenance

Projek Penyelenggaraan Lebuhraya Berhad (PROPEL) has undertaken repair and maintenance works on highway facilities, such as road works and repair works, road line painting, cleaning works on laybys and rest and service areas, trimming grass and landscaping along expressway areas, installing road furniture, and others. Meanwhile, the PROPEL Response Team Unit is a special response team unit.

The Karak Expressway and East Coast Expressway are maintained by Alloy Consolidated Sdn Bhd.

Traffic management
Since late 2006, every expressway in Malaysia has been monitored by the Malaysian Highway Authority (LLM) Traffic Management Centre (LLM TMC). However, in some parts of Klang Valley, the expressways are monitored by the Integrated Transport Information System (ITIS); expressways in George Town, Penang are  monitored by the  Penang Island City Council.

 Malaysian Highway Authority traffic information page

Toll system

Types of toll systems
Every expressway and highway in Malaysia has a toll system, which is either a closed toll system or open toll system. All transactions are in Malaysian Ringgit (RM)

Open system
Users only have to pay at certain toll plazas within the open system range for a fixed amount.

Closed system
Users collect toll tickets or touch in with their Touch 'n Go card North South Expressway issues the PLUSTransit cards and other closed toll expressways such as East Coast Expressway and South Klang Valley Expressway issues the transit card) before entering the expressway at respective toll plazas and pay an amount of toll or touch out with your same touch n go card at the exit toll plaza plus the distance from the plaza to the Limit of Maintenance Responsibility (LMR). The toll rate in this system is based on the distance traveled.

Starting 18 June 2013, the PLUSTransit reusable transit cards has been implemented at all PLUS expressways network to replace the transit ticket. Beginning 26 April 2017, the PLUSTransit Card no longer issue due upcoming full electronic toll collection at all PLUS Closed system, customer must touch in and out with the same card

Electronic toll collection
There are three types of the electronic toll collection (ETC) systems, Touch 'n Go card unit, Smart TAG on board unit and RFID tag. Touch 'n Go and Smart TAG, have been made compulsory in all expressways since 1 July 2004, following the instruction of the Works Minister, Datuk Seri S. Samy Vellu. Other electronic payment systems that were previously used by other highway operators such as PLUS TAG for all PLUS expressways network, Express TAG for Shah Alam Expressway, FasTrak for Damansara–Puchong Expressway and Sprint Expressway and SagaTag in Cheras–Kajang Expressway, were abolished in a move to standardise the electronic payment method.

Multi Lane Free Flow
The Multi Lane Free Flow (MLFF) is an electronic toll collection system that allows free flow high speed toll system highway for all its users. With MLFF, the current toll lanes at toll plazas will be replaced with readers at gantry across the highway to detect vehicle and deduct toll using the existing ETC when fully implemented. The Malaysian Highway Authority (MHA) is planning to implement MLFF system at all highways in stages starting 2010.

Toll rebate
Beginning 1 September 2009, the 20 per cent rebate given to motorists who pay toll charges more than 80 times a month, can be saved for up to six months. The rebate can be redeemed at 126 locations which would be announced in due time.

Toll rate classes

There are fixed toll rate classes for every Malaysian expressway except for the Penang Bridge and the SMART Tunnel where toll rates are not the same.

Expressways
These classes apply to every expressway in Malaysia (including Johor–Singapore Causeway, Malaysia–Singapore Second Link and Sultan Abdul Halim Muadzam Shah Bridge):

Penang Bridge

SMART Tunnel

Facilities
There are several facilities provided along Malaysian expressway as follows:
 Rest and Service Area – Rest and service areas (RSA) are located roughly about every 60 km along interstate expressways such as the North–South Expressway and the East Coast Expressway. However, some urban expressways may also provide RSA, such as the Shah Alam Expressway, the Damansara–Puchong Expressway and the Guthrie Corridor Expressway. A typical RSA may have a food court, fruit stall, craft shop, public toilets and baths, public telephones, huts (wakaf), petrol stations and prayer rooms (surau) for Muslims. Some RSAs may have ATMs, motels like "Highway Inn", convenience shops such as Highway Mart and 7-Eleven, fast food restaurants and a food court. The wireless broadband internet facility is now available in RSAs; the Tapah RSA in Perak was the first RSA on a Malaysian expressway to provide wireless broadband internet facilities.
 Layby – Laybys are basic parking lots beside the expressways that may also have public toilets and baths, fruit stall, huts (wakaf) and public telephones. However, some laybys may have a few food stalls and petrol stations. Usually, there are about two laybys in between every two RSAs.
 Overhead restaurants – Overhead restaurants are special RSAs with restaurants above the expressway. Unlike typical laybys and RSAs which are only accessible in one-way direction only, an overhead restaurant is accessible from both directions of the expressway. There are three overhead bridges in Malaysia – Sungai Buloh (North–South Expressway Northern Route), Ayer Keroh (North–South Expressway Southern Route) and USJ (North–South Expressway Central Link). The PLUS Art Gallery is located in Ayer Keroh Overhead Bridge Restaurant.
 Customer Service Centre (CSC) – Every toll plaza in Malaysia has a customer service centre. This centre includes highway maps, toll fare lists, information counters, Touch 'n Go card reload counters, Touch 'n Go and Smart TAG sales counters and more.
 Touch 'n Go Hub – The hub for the Touch 'n Go and Smart TAG sales.
 Touch 'n Go Spot – The spot for the Touch 'n Go and Smart TAG sales counter. Usually can be found at all petrol stations.
 Touch ‘n Go Drive-Through Purchase and Refill card lane (POS) – Touch 'n Go card users can refill existing or purchase new Touch 'n Go cards directly from the lane without the hassle of going to customer service centres. This Touch 'n Go POS lane are available at all expressways on the PLUS Expressway network.
 Vista point – Vista points are special parking areas that allow motorists to see scenic views of the expressway; available only at Senawang (both directions) and Ipoh (northbound only).
 Motorcycle shelter – Motorcycle shelters provide protection and shelter for motorcyclists from heavy rain. Usually, most motorcycle shelters are located below overhead bridges, but some may be special booths.
 Motorcycle lane – In some parts of the whole expressway, there is an additional lane designated for motorcycles. These lanes are usually about half the width of a normal lane on the North–South Expressway and are positioned on the extreme left side of the main carriageway in each direction of travel. These special lanes are found in Shah Alam Expressway, Butterworth–Kulim Expressway, Federal Highway and Guthrie Corridor Expressway
 Emergency phones – Emergency phones are located every 2 km along interstate expressways; useful if there are breakdowns on the expressway. Attendants from the nearest toll plaza will tow the broken cars to the nearest workshops.
 Tunnel emergency exits (Ventilation and escape shafts) – Tunnel emergency exits are located every 1 km along expressway tunnels, such as SMART Tunnel, Penchala Tunnel on Sprint Expressway, Menora Tunnel on North–South Expressway and Genting Sempah Tunnel on Kuala Lumpur–Karak Expressway.
 Highway hotline service – Every expressway has a hotline service.
 Highway patrol unit – Every expressway has a highway patrol unit.
 Highway helicopter patrol unit – This unit is available at all PLUS Expressway networks only.
 Traffic Control and Surveillance System (TCSS) – The Traffic Control and Surveillance System (TCSS) comprises a number of traffic monitoring systems such as Traffic Closed-Circuit Television (CCTV), Traffic Monitoring Centre (TMC), Variable Message Systems (VMS) and Vehicles Breakdown Sensors.
 Integrated Transport Information System (ITIS) – This system is normally found in the Klang Valley, Penang and Iskandar Malaysia/Johor Bahru.
 Road Transport Department (JPJ) Enforcement Stations – These stations can be found at Karak Expressway and East Coast Expressway. These JPJ enforcement stations have weighing bridges to detect heavy vehicles.
 Police Watch Tower – These towers can be found at all interstate expressways in Malaysia to monitor traffic situations during festive seasons.
 Warning lights – These yellow lights can be found in hazardous and accident areas.
 Automated Enforcement System (AES) – These systems can be found at accident-prone areas and the red-light camera at traffic light junctions.
 Speed Indicator Display (SID) – These systems can be found at the Kerinchi Link of the Sprint Expressway to remind drivers in the event they are exceeding the permitted speed limit not to do so.
 Runaway truck ramp – A traffic device that enables vehicles having braking problems to stop safely. These systems are found at mountainous areas such as at nearby Ipoh North Toll Plaza Interchange along the North–South Expressway Northern Route

Interchanges
These are the different types of expressway interchanges in Malaysia:
 Trumpet interchange – It is usually found in every closed toll system expressway like the North–South Expressway and East Coast Expressway. The trumpet design is popular as a highway exit with toll booths for the closed toll system because of the minimum construction cost of its toll booths.
 Cloverleaf interchange – It is more common in Malaysia to link two overlapping expressways because of its relatively cheaper cost. The biggest cloverleaf highway interchange in Malaysia is Bulatan Darul Ehsan a.k.a. Shah Alam Cloverleaf Interchange of Federal Highway in Shah Alam, Selangor.
 Diamond Interchange – It is more popular in Malaysia to join the expressway crossing over municipal roads.
 Multi-Level Stacked Diamond Interchange – It is a diamond interchange upgraded into a multi-level interchange. Examples include the Bandar Sunway Interchange between Damansara–Puchong Expressway and New Pantai Expressway in Petaling Jaya.
 Diverging diamond interchange – This is a rare type of diamond interchange which involves temporary lane changes, i.e. from left-hand traffic to right and then back to the left. Like SPUI, it allows traffic from two opposite directions to turn right at the same time but does not allow traffic to go straight ahead. Examples include the Freescale Interchange at Damansara–Puchong Expressway.
 Single-point urban interchange (SPUI) – A SPUI interchange is nearly similar with a typical diamond interchange but it allows traffic from two opposite directions to turn right at the same time; however, it does not allow traffic to go straight. Examples include the Danga City Mall interchange at Skudai Highway / Johor Bahru Inner Ring Road.
 Roundabout interchange – Very popular in Malaysia.
 Parclo interchange – An example of this is the Port Dickson Interchange on the North–South Expressway and Kapar Interchange on the New North Klang Straits Bypass.
 Directional T interchange – These interchanges are found at Nilai North and Nilai Interchanges of North–South Expressway and also Setia Alam Interchange and Bukit Lanjan Interchange on New Klang Valley Expressway.
 Stacked Interchange – Examples of these are the Penchala Interchange on the Damansara–Puchong Expressway and Penchala Link of the Sprint Expressway.
 Multi-Level Stacked Interchange – Examples of these are the Ampang Interchange on the Jalan Ampang and the Ampang flyover of the Kuala Lumpur Middle Ring Road 2.
 Multi-Level Stacked Roundabout – There are three-level and four-level roundabouts found in Malaysia. Examples of four-level roundabouts include the Segambut Interchange of Kuala Lumpur–Rawang Highway and Kewajipan Interchange of New Pantai Expressway.
 Double U-Turn Interchange – These interchanges found at Tampoi North interchange on the Skudai Highway and Pasir Gudang Highway.
 Left in/left out (LILO) junction – These junctions restrict the ingress and egress of the minor roads; they only permit left-turn entries. To turn to opposite direction, motorists may need to make a U-turn on the expressway. These junctions are very common in urban expressways such as in Sungai Besi Expressway and Damansara–Puchong Expressway.

Safety

Speed limits

Excluded vehicles
These vehicles may not use the expressways:

PLUS Expressways networks and East Coast Expressway (ECE)
 Bicycles
 Steam roller
 Tractors
 Excavators and backhoes

North–South Expressway Northern Route
(Sungai Buloh–Bukit Lanjan), New Klang Valley Expressway (Shah Alam–Jalan Duta), Federal Highway (Sungai Rasau–Batu Tiga): Monday to Friday (Except Public Holidays) from 6.30am to 9.30am
 Heavy vehicles weighing  or more

Ampang–Kuala Lumpur Elevated Highway (AKLEH)
 Bicycles

Maju Expressway (MEX) (Kuala Lumpur–Putrajaya Expressway (KLPE))
 Bicycles

SMART Tunnel
 Motorcycles and bicycles
 Bus
 Steam roller
 Heavy vehicles like lorries, trailers, etc.
 Tractors
 Excavators and backhoes

Accidents
Malaysian expressways are potential sites of fatal highway accidents in Malaysia, especially during festive seasons. However, accidents in Malaysia happen on federal, state, and municipal roads. Most road accidents are caused by the attitude of certain road users who drive dangerously over the speed limit.

Emergency lanes are for emergency vehicles only and for stopping area if breakdown. However, most Malaysians are still not aware about the safety by using the emergency lanes as an alternative route during traffic jam.

Accident-prone areas
 km 25 of Gunung Pulai near Kulai, Johor on North–South Expressway Southern Route
 km 171 to 141 of Tangkak–Pagoh stretch on North–South Expressway Southern Route
 km 25.1 of Jalan Duta toll plaza, Kuala Lumpur on North–South Expressway Northern Route
 km 293 to 310 of North–South Expressway Northern Route from Gopeng Interchange to Tapah Interchange (Gua Tempurung stretch)
 km 256  of old Jelapang toll plaza, Perak on North–South Expressway Northern Route
 km --- to --- of North–South Expressway Northern Route from Menora Tunnel to Sungai Perak Rest and Service Area, Perak
 km 30 to 35 of Gombak, Selangor on Kuala Lumpur–Karak Expressway (not far from Genting Sempah Tunnel).
 Sungai Besi sharp corner flyover bridge from Jalan Dewan Bahasa (formerly Jalan Lapangan Terbang) on Kuala Lumpur Middle Ring Road 1 towards Kuala Lumpur–Seremban Expressway.
 km  of Kelana Jaya on Damansara–Puchong Expressway near Kelana Jaya LRT stations.
 km  of Puchong on Damansara–Puchong Expressway near Tractors Malaysia.
 km  of Damansara Utama–Section 14 on Sprint Expressway.
 Subang Jaya aka Persiaran Tujuan Interchange on the railway bridge corner (from Kuala Lumpur to Subang Jaya) at the exit of Federal Highway.
 km --- to --- of the East Coast Expressway Phase 2 from Jabor to Kuala Terengganu.

During workdays/peak hours
During workdays or peak hours, there are many restricted routes on the expressways especially in the Klang Valley and Penang to ease congestion during peak hours in the morning such as Federal Highway (Sungai Rasau–Subang), New Klang Valley Expressway (Shah Alam–Jalan Duta), North–South Expressway Northern Route (Rawang–Bukit Lanjan) and Penang Bridge. Heavy vehicles (except buses and tankers) with laden and unladen heavy vehicles weighing  or more are not allowed to enter the expressway between 6:30 am until 9:30 am on Monday to Friday (except public holidays). A compound fines will be issued to heavy vehicles which flouted the rule.

During festive seasons
During festive seasons such as Chinese New Year, Deepavali, Christmas and Hari Raya, activities such as construction, road repairs and maintenance works are temporarily stopped to ensure a smoother traffic flow on the expressways. Meanwhile, heavy goods vehicles such as logging trucks, cement trucks, container trucks, construction materials trucks and other heavy goods vehicles (except tanker lorry, provision goods truck, crane, tow truck, fire engine, ambulance, etc.) are banned from using roads, highways, and expressways during festive seasons. A massive nationwide operation known as Ops Selamat (previously called Ops Sikap) is held annually by the Malaysian police to ensure safety on all roads in Malaysia during festive seasons. To smooth traffic flow during peak periods in the festive seasons, a Travel Time Advisory (TTA) has been set up at all interstate expressways such as PLUS Expressways network and East Coast Expressway. Some Touch n Go reload lane at all plus highway will be temporary closed during festive season according to the date by plus highway, customer your required to reload the card before entering highway

Automated Enforcement System
The Automated Enforcement System (AES) is the road safety enforcement system to monitored all federal roads, highways and expressways in Malaysia. This system came into effect on 22 September 2012.

Type of AES
 Speed light camera
 Red light camera

Natural hazards
Other hazardous conditions on expressways include landslides, crosswinds, fog, storms, road damages, paddy (jerami) burning activities and flash floods.

List of landslide-prone areas
 km  of Bukit Lanjan–Jalan Duta on North–South Expressway Northern Route
 km  of Bukit Lanjan between Kota Damansara–Bukit Lanjan on New Klang Valley Expressway
 km  of Gua Tempurung between Gopeng–Tapah on North–South Expressway Northern Route
 km  of Bukit Merah between Bukit Merah–Taiping (North) on North–South Expressway Northern Route
 km  of Sungai Perak–Jelapang Toll Plaza on North–South Expressway Northern Route
 km  of Bukit Berapit between Changkat Jering–Kuala Kangsar on North–South Expressway Northern Route
 km  of Gombak–Genting Sempah on Karak Expressway
 km  of Bukit Tinggi–Bentong on Karak Expressway
 km  of Gunung Ma'okil between Pagoh–Yong Peng on North–South Expressway Southern Route
 km  of Puchong–Seri Kembangan on Damansara–Puchong Expressway near Puchong Selatan toll plaza.
 km 15 of Skudai–Senai (North) on North–South Expressway Southern Route near Skudai toll plaza.

List of crosswind-prone areas
 km of Senawang–Pedas-Linggi on North–South Expressway Southern Route
 km of Alor Gajah–Ayer Keroh on North–South Expressway Southern Route
 km along East Coast Expressway

List of flash flood-prone areas
 km 15 of Batu Tiga Interchange on Federal Highway
 km of Shah Alam Interchange on New Klang Valley Expressway
 km of Sungai Besi on Sungai Besi Expressway near Razak Mansion
 km of Seberang Jaya Interchange underpass on Butterworth–Kulim Expressway near Carrefour Seberang Jaya
 km of Alor Star–Jitra of the North–South Expressway Northern Route
 km 173.9–171.9 of Jasin, Melaka and Tangkak, Johor on North–South Expressway Southern Route

Controversial issues
There are several controversial issues regarding the construction of expressways. The main issue is the increase of toll rates, which can be a huge burden especially for residents of Kuala Lumpur and the surrounding Klang Valley conurbation.

There are also various parties who question the capability of the numerous expressways in Klang Valley to overcome traffic congestion, which does not show signs of improvement with the construction of new expressways. Three chief factors were blamed for the urban expressway congestion, namely the short-sighted policies by the authorities, greedy property developers, and the failure of local municipal councils to control the development in the Klang Valley.

There are also several protests being held by residents of some housing areas being affected by several planned expressways, such as the Sungai Besi–Ulu Klang Elevated Expressway (SUKE), Damansara–Shah Alam Elevated Expressway (DASH) and Kinrara–Damansara Expressway (KIDEX Skyway) (project scrapped in 2014). Environmental issues such as road noise and worsening congestion became the chief reasons of those protests.

Other controversial issues include the following:
 The cracks found on beams on the Kepong Flyover in Kuala Lumpur Middle Ring Road 2 (MRR2) on 10 August 2004.
 The flyover which collapsed on Setia Alam Interchange in New Klang Valley Expressway during construction on 10 July 2005, where about 4 people died.
 The 8 fallen I-beams at the Pajam Interchange in Negeri Sembilan during the construction of the Kajang–Seremban Highway (LEKAS Highway) on the night of 27 September 2007.
 The ramp collapse at the Batu Maung Interchange at Batu Maung side of the Penang Second Bridge during construction on 6 June 2013 killing one person.

Facts
 The Tanjung Malim–Slim River tolled road (Federal Route 1) is the first tolled highway in Malaysia.
 The Sultan Yahya Petra Bridge (Federal Route 3 ) is the first tolled bridge in Malaysia.
 PLUS Expressways is the largest highway concessionaries operator company in Malaysia, also the largest listed toll expressway operator in Southeast Asia, and the eighth largest in the world. The second largest is Prolintas.
 The longest bridge in Malaysia is Sultan Abdul Halim Muadzam Shah Bridge (Penang Second Bridge) E28 with a total length . The second longest bridge is Penang Bridge E36 with a total length .
 The longest expressway in Malaysia is North–South Expressway E1, E2, with a total length .
 The longest expressway river bridge in Malaysia is the Sungai Johor Bridge on Senai–Desaru Expressway E22 with a total length . The bridge also the longest single plane cable-stayed bridge in Malaysia.
 The section between Cahaya Baru and Penawar of the Senai–Desaru Expressway E22 is built as a two-lane single carriageway making the first two-lane controlled-access expressway in Malaysia.
 The first cable-stayed land bridge in Malaysia is the LDP cable stayed bridge at the Freescale interchange on Damansara–Puchong Expressway E11 with a total length 
 The most expensive section of the expressway is the Gopeng–Tapah section on the North–South Expressway Northern Route E1. At RM200 million, it translates to RM 20 million per kilometre.  Embankment strengthening is the major contributor for this escalating cost.
 The largest toll plaza in Malaysia is Bandar Cassia-PLUS Toll Plaza (Gateway Arch Toll Plaza) in Penang Second Bridge E28 with over 28 lanes (excluding additional motorcycle toll plaza). The second largest toll plaza is Sungai Besi Toll Plaza in North–South Expressway Southern Route E2 with over 18 lanes (excluding additional toll booths).
 Bandar Saujana Putra Interchange on North–South Expressway Central Link E6 and South Klang Valley Expressway E26 is the only expressway interchange in Malaysia to have two toll plazas.
 The North–South Expressway E1, E2, is the first expressway in Malaysia that provided an Overhead Bridge Restaurant (OBR).
 The busiest expressway in Malaysia is Federal Highway route 2 from Klang to Kuala Lumpur
 Federal Highway route 2 is the first highway in Malaysia to have a motorcycle lane.
 The first highway tunnel in Malaysia is Genting Sempah Tunnel on Kuala Lumpur–Karak Expressway E8.
 The first elevated highway in Malaysia is Ampang–Kuala Lumpur Elevated Highway (AKLEH) E12.
 The longest flyover bridge in Malaysia is Batu Tiga Flyover on North–South Expressway Central Link E6.
 SMART Tunnel E38 is the longest motorway tunnel, as well as the first double-decked tunnel and the first tunnel that has a stormwater tunnel and a motorway tunnel in Malaysia.
 The widest tunnel in Malaysia is Penchala Tunnel on Penchala Link of Sprint Expressway E23.
 The first expressway with double-decked carriageway in Malaysia is Kerinchi Link on Sprint Expressway E23.
 The Kuala Lumpur–Karak Expressway E8 is the only expressway in Malaysia has a separate carriageway at Genting Sempah in Selangor–Pahang border (one for Selangor side and one for Pahang side) due to their geographical locations.
 The biggest cloverleaf highway interchange in Malaysia is Bulatan Darul Ehsan Interchange of Federal Highway route 2 and Kemuning–Shah Alam Highway E13 in Shah Alam, Selangor.
 The largest highway interchange in Malaysia is Gelugor Complex Interchange at Penang Bridge E36.
 The PLUS Speedway (formerly ELITE Speedway) is the first go-kart circuit in the Malaysian expressways. The circuit is located near the USJ Rest and Service Area on North–South Expressway Central Link E6.
 Tapah Rest and Service Area (both bound) on North–South Expressway Northern Route E1 in Perak is the first rest and service area in the Malaysian expressway to have wireless broadband internet facilities.
 The PLUS Art Gallery in Ayer Keroh Overhead Bridge Restaurant (OBR) North–South Expressway Southern Route E2 is the first highway art gallery in Malaysia.
 The Perasing Rest and Service Area on the East Coast Expressway E8 is the biggest Rest and Service Area on the ECE network. It is only accessible by the directional T interchange to R&R in which it is probably the only one of its type in Malaysia.
 The largest advertising board on the Malaysian expressways is the Giant Wau Kite Spectacular Advertising Board on the North–South Expressway Southern Route E2 near Sungai Besi and the North–South Expressway Central Link E6 near Putrajaya.
 While most toll expressways in Malaysia use green signboards with white letters, the MetaCorp expressway networks (East–West Link Expressway and Kuala Lumpur–Seremban Expressway) E37 use blue signboards instead, as if they are municipal expressways.
 Before 2007, all federally funded expressways have no exit numbering system; however, the exit number system similar to toll expressways was introduced in 2007 exclusively for Federal Highway route 2 (then followed by the Putrajaya–Cyberjaya Expressway route 29); thus making the Federal Highway as the first federal expressway with expressway exit numbering system.
 Tun Salahuddin Bridge E24 was the first and was the only toll expressway in the East Malaysia, while almost all toll expressways are built in the Peninsular Malaysia. The Tun Salahuddin Bridge was only the toll expressway without any grade-separated interchanges. The road have been toll free since 1st January, 2016. 
 The Machap Rest and Service Area (north bound) at the North–South Expressway Southern Route E2 is the first fully air-conditioned rest area in Malaysia.
 The Sungai Perak Rest and Service Area (south bound) at the North–South Expressway Northern Route E1 in Perak is the first rest and service area in the Malaysian expressway to have an eco-management theme known as "The Green Trail" or "Jejak Hijau".
 Putrajaya–Cyberjaya Expressway route 29 is the first future federal highway on Multimedia Super Corridor (MSC).
 PLUSMiles is the first and only toll rebate loyalty programme in the Malaysian expressways.
 Shah Alam is the first and currently the only city in Malaysia to have its own municipal route numbering system, while other municipal routes in Malaysia do not bear any route numbering scheme.
 The longest closed toll collection system coverage in Malaysia is from Juru toll plaza to Skudai toll plaza (previously Ipoh South toll plaza to Skudai toll plaza), which runs through the North–South Expressway Northern Route E1, New Klang Valley Expressway E1, North–South Expressway Central Link E6 and North–South Expressway Southern Route E2.
 The North–South Expressway Northern Route E1 is the first and the only expressway in Malaysia to have a runaway truck ramp near Jelapang, Ipoh.
 There is one semi tunnel on the East–West Highway (Route 4) from Gerik, Perak to Jeli, Kelantan. It is probably the only one of its type in Malaysia.
 The first true two-lane expressway with full access control in Malaysia is the Cahaya Baru–Penawar section of the Senai–Desaru Expressway E22.
 The Johor Bahru Eastern Dispersal Link Expressway E14 is the only expressway in Malaysia has a controlled-access toll free expressway.
 The Kota Bharu–Kuala Krai Expressway, which is under construction, will be the first state-owned controlled-access expressway once completed.
 The East Coast Expressway E8 is the first expressway to have a different concessionaires, ANIH Berhad (phase 2) and Lebuhraya Pantai Timur 2 (LPT2) Sdn Bhd (phase 2).
 The sections of the East Coast Expressway E8 Phase 2: Jabur–Bukit Besi and Telemung–Kuala Terengganu, are the first expressway build by the Malaysian Public Works Department (JKR).

List of expressways and highways

Toll expressways
List of the expressways which are under the administration of the federal Malaysian Highway Authority (MHA). The Malaysian expressways are controlled-access highways.

In popular culture

Films
These films were filmed mainly on Malaysian expressways:

Televisions

Dramas

Documentary

Video games
 Burnout Dominator – The Spiritual City track is based on the real-life Kuala Lumpur city, with signboards leading to some expressways such as E2 North–South Expressway Southern Route and E23 Sprint Expressway.

Gallery

See also
 Road signs in Malaysia
 National Speed Limits
 Malaysian Federal Roads system
 Malaysian Highway Authority
 Malaysian State Roads system
 Multi Lane Free Flow
 Electronic Toll Collection
 Teras Teknologi (TERAS)
 Highway
 Driveway
 Freeway
 Motorway
 Autobahn
 Autoroutes of France
 Controlled-access highway
 Interstate Highway System
 Expressways of Japan
 Expressways of China
 Highways in Colombia
 Asian Highway Network

References

External links
 Malaysian Highway Authority official page
 Malaysian Highway Authority traffic information page
 "Travel Smarter" – Malaysian Highway Concessionaires Company Association (PSKLM) highway information page
 PLUS Malaysia Berhad – concession holder for:
 North–South Expressway
 Malaysia–Singapore Second Link
 North–South Expressway Central Link
 Seremban–Port Dickson Highway
 Butterworth–Kulim Expressway
 Penang Bridge
 ANIH Berhad – concession holder for:
 Karak Expressway
 East Coast Expressway
 Kuala Lumpur–Seremban Expressway
 East–West Link Expressway
 Gamuda Berhad – concession holder for:
 SPRINT – Sprint Expressway
 LITRAK – Damansara–Puchong Expressway
 KESAS – Shah Alam Expressway
 SMART – SMART Tunnel
 Road Builder – concession holder for:
 Besraya – Sungai Besi Expressway
 NPE – New Pantai Expressway
 LEKAS – Kajang–Seremban Highway
 Grand Saga website
 Propel Berhad – concession holder for highway maintenance in Malaysia
 Motorways-exist – Exilist of expressway in Malaysia
 Komuniti PTT Zello Channel Lebuhraya Utara–Selatan

 
 
Malaysian Public Works Department